The National Archives Centre (or CNA) is the national archives of Burkina Faso. It is located in Ouagadougou. Since 2010, the Archivistes sans Frontières project has been assisting Burkina Faso in developing the archives.

See also
 National Library of Burkina Faso

References

Burkina Faso
History of Burkina Faso
Ouagadougou